Kavon "Hak" Hakimzadeh (Persian: کاوون حکیم زاده) (born 1960s) is an Iranian-American rear admiral in the US Navy. From August 2021 of April 2022, he served as the director of aircraft carrier requirements in the office of the Chief of Naval Operations. He previously served as commanding officer of the  aircraft carrier from 2019 to 2021. On February 1, 2022, he was nominated for promotion to rear admiral. He is now the director of joint/fleet operations of the United States Fleet Forces Command.

Early life
Kavon Hakimzadeh was born in Texas in the 1960s to an Iranian father and American mother. When he was a baby, his family moved to Iran.

Hakimzadeh attended an international school where they spoke both Persian and English. He kept the faith of his Southern Baptist mother.

Hakimzadeh lived in Iran until 1979, when his family was forced to flee to the United States during the Islamic Revolution.

Military career 

Hakimzadeh enlisted in the Navy in 1987 and earned a Navy ROTC scholarship to Carnegie Mellon University. Upon commission, he became a flight officer on the E-2 Hawkeye. He later joined the Tigertails for his initial sea tour. Additional sea duty assignments include Carrier Strike Group Eight as Flag Lieutenant, VAW-123 Screwtops as a department head and VAW-126 Seahawks as executive officer and commanding officer.

He served ashore with the VAW-120 Greyhawks as an FRS instructor, as a student at the Naval War College, and duty under instruction as an Arthur S. Moreau fellow. He completed three Pentagon assignments with the Joint Staff (J-3) readiness division, SOUTHCOM Washington field office and OPNAV N00X and N9I as a strike warfare analyst and assessment branch head.

Hakimzadeh holds master's degrees from Old Dominion University, the Naval War College and the Johns Hopkins University School of Advanced International Studies. He is a joint qualified officer and has completed the Aviation Nuclear Officer training pipeline.

He began serving as director of aircraft carrier requirements in the office of the Chief of Naval Operations in August 2021.

References

1960s births
Year of birth uncertain
Living people
American people of Iranian descent
Carnegie Mellon University alumni
Paul H. Nitze School of Advanced International Studies alumni
Military personnel from Texas
Naval War College alumni
Old Dominion University alumni
21st-century American naval officers
Recipients of the Legion of Merit
United States Naval Flight Officers
United States Navy rear admirals (lower half)